Ricardo "Ricki" Ruiz is an American politician and community organizer serving as a member of the Oregon House of Representatives from the 50th district.

Early life and education 
Born in Portland, Oregon and raised in Gresham, Oregon, Ruiz graduated from the Reynolds School District in 2012 and later earned a Bachelor of Arts degree in social entrepreneurship from Warner Pacific University. He then earned a Master of Business Administration from Southern New Hampshire University.

Career 
Prior to entering politics, Ruiz has worked as a community organizer and as a community services coordinator for the city of Gresham, Oregon. In the Democratic primary for the 50th district, Ruiz defeated William Miller. Ruiz defeated Republican nominee Amelia Salvador in the November 2020 general election.

References 

Democratic Party members of the Oregon House of Representatives
Hispanic and Latino American state legislators in Oregon
Living people
People from Gresham, Oregon
Warner Pacific University alumni
Southern New Hampshire University alumni
Year of birth missing (living people)